KK Bosna Meridianbet is a professional basketball team based in Sarajevo, Bosnia and Herzegovina. It is the most successful Bosnian club of all time, having been the EuroLeague champion by winning the 1978–79 FIBA European Champions Cup. The club competes in the Basketball Championship of Bosnia and Herzegovina. It is part of the University Sport Society USD Bosna.

History

1951–1955: Formation and early years
The club was founded in 1951 as a member of the University Sports Society Bosna. The club's first chairman and coach was doctor Nedžad Brkić, with the roster composed mostly of students enrolled in the University of Sarajevo. The first four years of the club's existence were spent in the lower-tier Sarajevo city league, which the team went on to win in 1955, earning a promotion to the SR Bosnia and Herzegovina league. The team roster in these early years included the likes of Brkić, Marušić, Takač, Bise, Bjelica, Cindrić, Bilić, Đurasković, Fetahagić, Uzelac, Džapa, Pilav, Hofbauer, Lovrenović, Beganović and Dimitrijević.

1955–1972: Attempting to reach top-tier Yugoslav First League
For the next 17 years the club competed in the regional SR Bosnia and Herzegovina league, steadily building a team with which it could enter the Yugoslav First League. 

On 28 April 1972 a decisive win against cross-town rivals KK Željezničar Sarajevo would promote the club to the top-tier of Yugoslav basketball where it would compete for the next 20 years. The architect of the club's historic triumf and later European glory was charismatic young coach Bogdan Tanjević. The players that managed to achieve the promotion to the top national league were Jovo Terzić, Mirsad Milavić, Zdravko Čečur, Milan Pavlić, Aleksandar Nadaždin, Dumić, Bruno Soče, Žarko Varajić, Slobodan Pejović, Svetislav Pešić, Rođeni Krvavac, and Anto Đogić.

1972–1984: The glory years
The future European championship winning roster was completed with the arrival of legendary Mirza Delibašić in 1972. The first 6 seasons in the Yugoslav First League represented a coming of age process, with the team eventually going on to win its first title in 1978, led by star players Ratko Radovanović, Žarko Varajić and Mirza Delibašić. A year later KK Bosna became the first team, aside from CSKA Moscow, to win the European championship without a single foreign player on its roster. Namely, on April 5, 1979 the team, led by the late Delibašić and game MVP Varajić, defeated Italian Powerhouse Emerson Varese 96:93. The club started its EuroLeague season in the Quarterfinal group stage, finishing first in its group. Once in the Semifinals, the side  sent a message to contenders by edging the defending champions Real Madrid 114:109 in overtime, in Sarajevo. KK Bosna would eventually win all of its home games and would advance to the title game by edging Greek side Olympiacos 83–88, in Piraeus. Bosna's opponent in the final would either be Emerson Varese or Real Madrid, who faced each other off in the final game of the round. The Italian side beat Madrid 82:83. The aforementioned game will be remembered for Prada's misses: Namely, Luis Maria Prada famously missed 3 consecutive free throws with no time on the clock, forever changing European basketball history. Once in the title game, KK Bosna downed mighty Emerson Varese 96:93 in front of 15,000 fans in the Palais des Sports, Grenoble, France. Varajić led the team in scoring with 45 points, while Delibašić followed with 30. The former is still the record holder for most points in a Euroleague final. Radovanović added 10 more points, while Americans Bob Morse and Charlie Yelverton scored 30 and 27 points respectively for Varese. In the next four seasons KK Bosna would go on to win two more Yugoslav championships (1979-80; 1982-83), as well as a silver medal in the 1980 FIBA Intercontinental Cup, which it hosted. A second Yugoslav Cup triumf followed a year later.

1984–1992: Pre-war years
After nearly a decade of continuous success, most of the star players transferred abroad in the mid-1980s. Namely, Delibašić, Varajić, Radovanović, Đogić along with coach Bogdan Tanjević who took over Juventus Caserta moved to foreign clubs. As a result, the club management decided to transfer members of its talented youth department to the senior team, along with bringing in a handful of new players from other Yugoslav clubs. Nenad Marković, Gordan Firić, Samir Avdić and others all came in through the youth ranks but their time in the club was cut short by the start of the Bosnian War.

1992–1997: Hardest of times
With the start of the Bosnian War in 1992 competitive basketball was halted in the newly independent country for nearly four years. A talented generation on the verge of success was forced to transfer to foreign sides, and in doing so the club was forced to fight for bare survival. The side's star prospect, Nenad Marković, joined Italian side Stefanel Trieste, while the likes of Avdić, Firić and others left to Spain, Italy and Turkey. In 1993, under the helm of legendary Ante Djogic and his assistant Mladen Jojic, a talented group of youngsters, who stayed in Sarajevo under the siege, was selected and which continued with trainings and competition organized in difficult war environment. Those youngsters, aged btw. 15 and 19, were: Konakovic, Moratic, Bradic, Tihic, Mirkovic, Dzafo, Isakovic, brothers Damir Vukotic and Vedran Vukotic, Brankovic, Tinjak. At the end of the 1997–98 season, a play-off for the national title was organized. KK Bosna lost 2–1 to HKK Široki in the final series. A year later the maroon-whites, brandishing a roster that included Mirković, Terzić, Subašić, Konaković, Kurtagić, Halimić, Lerić, Isaković, Bukva, Džuho and Radović, coached by former European championship-winning team member, Sabit Hadžić won the national title after a play-off victory.

Famous members
The club remembrance has gathered all players, coach Tanjević, assistant coaches Prodanović, Krehić, first club's coach Halilović and all the club members who helped Bosna achieve a great success, such as the winning of the European title. Unfortunately, two key members of Bosna championship team are not alive anymore. Mirza Delibašić and Sabahudin Bilalović have died, but they will be remembered by the club and fans forever. Many great players and coaches from the region joined the remembrance in memory to one great generation of Bosna players and their accomplishments.

2014–present: Change of name
In October 2014, the club decided to continue under the new name, Bosna Royal.

Title sponsor

On October 27, the president of KK Bosna and representatives of the Meridianbet company signed a multi-year title sponsorship contract.  "Students" will compete under the new name KK Bosna Meridianbet from the 2022/23 season.

Supporters

KK Bosna traditionally garnered a majority of its fan base from supporters of FK Sarajevo, and more specifically the latter's ultras firm, Horde zla, given the fact that both clubs share unique maroon and white team colours.

Through time the two sides became colloquially interchangeable, as Horde zla equally followed both, with the two clubs forming an unofficial, so-called Maroon Family. On 29 August 2013 FK Sarajevo and KK Bosna's handball sister club, RK Bosna, signed a cooperation agreement based on the principle of strengthening ties between the aforementioned family members. On 6 November 2013 the same was done between FK Sarajevo and KK Bosna Royal, by which the forty-year-old relationship was officialized.

Home venues

KK Bosna Royal play their home fixtures at the Skenderija Sports Center, located in the Centar Municipality of Sarajevo. It was constructed in 1969 as a cultural and sport center, but was later revitalized and expanded for the 1984 Winter Olympic Games. Below the structure is a shopping mall. It sustained minor damage during the war, but is decaying due to lack of upkeep, it is revitalized since 2007. On 12 February 2012, after a record snowfall in Sarajevo, the roof of one of the halls fell in making that building unusable. The damage after this is said to be 'huge' and is yet unknown if that building will be rebuilt.

In 1977, when Sarajevo was voted to host the 1984 Winter Olympics, they discovered that they needed more than only the brand-new building Zetra to host every figure skating and ice hockey event. So they started to reconstruct and expand the Skenderija into a real state-of-the-art ice-sports centre. It was also chosen as the centre for the representatives and press-reporters.

KK Bosna Royal occasionally hosts games in the Olympic Hall Juan Antonio Samaranch, previously known as Zetra Olympic Hall. The arena was constructed specifically for the 1984 Winter Olympics, hosted in Sarajevo, and was completed in 1983. Its first major event was the 1983 World Junior Speed Skating Championships. It was described as an "ultramodern, angular edifice" with a copper roof.

Players

Current roster

Notable players

 Žarko Varajić
 Mirza Delibašić
 Anto Đogić
 Ratko Radovanović
 Predrag Benaček
 Boro Vučević
 Emir Mutapčić
 Zdravko Radulović
 Mario Primorac
 Sabahudin Bilalović
 Kenan Bajramović
 Edin Bavčić
 J.R. Bremer
 Nihad Đedović
 Goran Ikonić
 Nenad Marković
 Elvir Ovčina
 Vedran Bosnić
 Muhamed Pašalić
 Saša Vasiljević
 Hasan Rizvić
 Suad Šehović
 Lance Williams

Honours
Total titles: 13

Domestic competitions
 Bosnia and Herzegovina League   
 Winners (4): 1998–99, 2004–05, 2005–06, 2007–08
 Cup of Bosnia and Herzegovina     
 Winners (3): 2004–05, 2008–09, 2009–10

Former domestic competitions
 Yugoslav League (defunct)
 Winners (3): 1977–78, 1979–80, 1982–83
 Runners-up (1): 1976–77
 Yugoslav Cup (defunct)    
 Winners (2): 1977–78, 1983–84
 Runners-up (3): 1979-80, 1985–86, 1991–92

European competitions

 EuroLeague
 Winners (1): 1978–79
 3rd place (1): 1979–80
 4th place (2): 1980–81, 1983–84
 FIBA Korać Cup (defunct)
 Runners-up (1): 1977–78
 Semifinalist (1): 1989–90

Worldwide competitions
 FIBA Intercontinental Cup
 Runners-up (1): 1979
 3rd (1): 1980

International record

In European and worldwide competitions

Records

2012–2019

Club management
As of 23 February 2016

List of club presidents

List of directors

List of sporting directors

Coaching history

Below is a list of KK Bosna Royal coaches from 1951 until the present day.
<div style="font-size:100%">

Kit

Recent finishes and attendance

See also 
 Mirza Delibašić Memorial

References

External links

ABA
avaz 
Basketball.RealGM
BHBasket 
Meridiansport BH                                                                          
BIH 
Bljesak
eurobasket
Dnevnik 

Ekskluziva 
Facebook 
Faktor 
FIBA
Fokus 
Hercegovina
Jabuka
KKBosna 

Klix 
Kosarka.org
mondo 
nezavisne 
Oslobođenje 
pogled 
Radio Sarajevo 
SCsport 

sport1 
sportske 
SportSport 
Srpskacafe 
Tuzla LIVE 
Tuzlanski 
USD 
YouTube

 
Basketball teams in Yugoslavia
Basketball teams in Bosnia and Herzegovina
Bosna
Sport in Sarajevo
Basketball teams established in 1951
1951 establishments in Yugoslavia